Eulithis prunata, the phoenix, is a moth of the genus Eulithis in the family Geometridae.

Description
The moth has a wingspan from about 28 to 37 mm. The ground colour of the forewing is dark brown. The midfield is bordered by grey-white or brown-white cross bands on both sides and shows a strong point-shaped bulge outward. On the distal white wavy line, there are several black arrow stains contrasted white. Below the apex there is a large, dark, crescent-shaped spot located. Three bright wavy lines are visible on the grey rear wings.

Distribution
Palearctic

Subspecies
Eulithis prunata prunata (Europe)
Eulithis prunata leucoptera (Kamchatka, the Amur region, Sakhalin, Korea, Japan)
Eulithis prunata teberdensis (Caucasus, Georgia, Armenia)

Biology

Larval food plants
The larvae feed on currant bushes of the genus Ribes, including  Alpine Currant, Blackcurrant, Gooseberry, Redcurrant and Ribes aureum. Ornamental member of the genus may also be hosts.

References

External links

UK Moths
Fauna Europaea
Lepiforum.de

Cidariini
Geometrid moths of Great Britain
Moths described in 1758
Moths of Europe
Moths of Japan
Moths of Asia
Taxa named by Carl Linnaeus